In earlier times, the Balkan Mountains were known as the Haemus Mons. It is believed that the name is derived from a  Thracian word *saimon, 'mountain ridge', which is unattested but conjectured as the original Thracian form of Greek Emos.

Another classic etymology derives the name 'Haemos' from the myth about the fight of Zeus and the dragon Typhon:

"He was again driven to Thrace and hurled entire mountains at Zeus in the battle around Mount Haemus. When these bounced back upon him under the force of the thunderbolt, blood gushed out on the mountain. From this, they say, the mountain is called Haemus ("bloody")."

In antiquity, the mountain range and the area around it was populated by free Thracian peoples such as the Bessi, Dii, and Satrae. Herodotus records that an oracle-shrine of Dionysus (originally a Thracian god whose cult became widespread among the ancient Greeks) was located atop one of its mountains.

John Milton's Sylvarum Liber (Naturam non pati senium, v. 29) contains a reference to "lofty Haemus",
Tunc etiam aërei divulsis sedibus Hæmi
the summit even of lofty Haemus shall crumble;

Alexander Pope mentions Haemus in connection with Orpheus in his Ode for St. Cecilia's Day:
Hark! Haemus resounds with the Bacchanals' cries.

In classical Latin poetry Haemus was drawn into association with the Roman civil wars; although geographically incorrect, it was attractive most likely because it was a homonym with the Greek word for blood (haima) and bloody (haimon), as well as for its connection to the singer Orpheus. (See Lucan Civil War 6.576, 7.174, Ovid Metam. 10.77, Ex Ponto 4.5.5, Virgil Georgics 1.492.)

Other uses
Haemus Mons is also a 10 km high mountain on the Jupiter moon Io.

See also
Balkan Peninsula
Dacia
Haemus (the mythical Thracian King)
Montes Haemus (lunar mountain range)

References 

Mountain ranges of Europe
Geography of ancient Thrace